Tetramethylammonium auride, is an ionic compound containing tetramethylammonium as cation and gold in a –1 oxidation state as anion. It is an example of a compound containing this rare ionic form of gold, and the first auride paired with a cation that is not a metal atom that has been synthesized.

References

Further reading
 doi:10.1021/acs.inorgchem.2c00600 – Use of this compound to study the nature of tetramethylammonium–anion bonding

Gold compounds
Tetramethylammonium salts